See Art periods for a chronological list.

This is a list of art movements in alphabetical order.  These terms, helpful for curricula or anthologies, evolved over time to group artists who are often loosely related.  Some of these movements were defined by the members themselves, while other terms emerged decades or centuries after the periods in question.

A
Afrofuturism
ASCII art
Abstract art
Art Brut
Abstract expressionism
Abstract illusionism
Academic art
Action painting
Aestheticism
Altermodern
American Barbizon school
American impressionism
American realism
American Scene Painting
Analytical art
Antipodeans
Arabesque
Arbeitsrat für Kunst
Art & Language
Art Deco
Art Informel
Art Nouveau
Art photography
Arte Povera
Arts and Crafts movement
Ashcan School
Assemblage
Australian Tonalism
Les Automatistes
Auto-destructive art
Avant-garde

B
Barbizon school
Baroque
Bauhaus
Berlin Secession
Black Arts Movement
Bengal School of Art
Brutalism

C
Classical Realism
Cloisonnism
COBRA
Color Field
Context art
Computer art
Concrete art
Conceptual art
Constructivism
Crystal Cubism
Cubo-Futurism
Cubism
Cynical realism

D
Dada
Dansaekhwa
Danube school
Dau-al-Set
De Stijl (also known as Neoplasticism'')
Deconstructivism
Didacticism
Digital art

E
Ecological Art
Environmental art
Modern European ink painting
Excessivism
Exoticism
Expressionism

F
Fantastic realism
Fauvism
Feminist art
Figurative art
Figuration Libre
Fine Art
Folk art
Fluxus
Funk art
Futurism

G
Geometric abstract art
Glitch art
Graffiti/Street Art
Gutai group
Gothic art

H
Happening
Harlem Renaissance
Heidelberg School
Hudson River School
Hurufiyya 
Hypermodernism
Hyperrealism

I
Impressionism
Incoherents
Interactive Art
Institutional critique
International Gothic
International Typographic Style

K
Kinetic art
Kinetic Pointillism 
Kitsch movement

L
Land art
Les Nabis
Letterism
Light and Space
Lowbrow
Lyco art
Lyrical abstraction

M
Magic realism
Mail art
Mannerism
Massurrealism
Maximalism
Metaphysical painting
Mingei
Minimalism
Modernism
Modular constructivism
manga

N
Naive art
Neoclassicism
Neo-Dada
Neo-expressionism
Neo-Fauvism
Neo-figurative
Neogeo (art)
Neoism
Neo-primitivism
Neo-romanticism
Net art
New Objectivity
New Sculpture
Northwest School
Nuclear art

O
Objective abstraction
Op Art
Orphism

P
Photorealism
Panfuturism
Paris School
Pixel art
Plasticien
Plein Air
Pointillism
Pop art
Post-impressionism
Postminimalism
Precisionism
Pre-Raphaelitism
Primitivism
Private Press
Process art
Psychedelic art
Purism

Q
Qajar art
Quito School

R
Rasquache
Rayonism
Realism
Regionalism
Remodernism
Renaissance
Retrofuturism
Rococo
Romanesque
Romanticism

S
Samikshavad
Serial art
Shin hanga
Shock art
Sōsaku hanga
Socialist realism
Sots art
Space art
Street art
Stuckism
Sumatraism
Superflat
Suprematism
Surrealism
Symbolism
Synchromism
Synthetism

T
Tachisme (aka Informel)
Temporary art
Toyism
Transgressive art
Tonalism

U
Ukiyo-e
Underground comix
Unilalianism

V
Vancouver School
Vanitas
Verdadism
Video art
Visual Art
Viennese Actionism
Vorticism

X
Xenocentrism

See also

Art periods
List of musical movements
Art movement

 
Art movements